Nezamyslice is a market town in Prostějov District in the Olomouc Region of the Czech Republic. It has about 1,500 inhabitants.

Administrative parts
The village of Těšice is an administrative part of Nezamyslice.

History
The first written mention of Nezamyslice is from 1276. The village of Těšice was first mentioned in 1274.

Notable people
Jan of Předbořice, 14th century priest; abbot of the Nezamyslice Monastery

References

Populated places in Prostějov District
Market towns in the Czech Republic